Tanzania competed at the 1980 Summer Olympics in Moscow, USSR.  The nation won its first ever Olympic medals at these Games.

Medalists

Athletics

Men
Track & road events

Field events

Women
Track & road events

Boxing

Men

Field hockey

Men's Team Competition
Team Roster
 Leopold Gracias
 Benedict Mendes
 Soter da Silva
 Abraham Sykes
 Yusuf Manwar
 Singh Jaypal
 Mohamed Manji 
 Rajabu Rajab
 Jasbir Virdee 
 Islam Islam
 Pirbhai Erfan
 Hira Adnan
 Stephen d'Silva 
 Frederick Furtado 
 Taherali Hassanali 
 Anoop Mukundan
 Patrick Toto
 Julias Peter

Preliminary round

Fifth place match

References

sports-reference
Official Olympic Reports
International Olympic Committee results database

Nations at the 1980 Summer Olympics
1980
Oly